Eoophyla stepheni is a moth in the family Crambidae. It was described by David John Lawrence Agassiz in 2012. It is found in the Republic of the Congo, Cameroon, Zambia and Zimbabwe.

The wingspan is 12–14 mm. The base of the forewings is pale yellowish with a yellowish antemedian fascia followed by a brownish line. The base of the hindwings is whitish with a yellow antemedian fascia.

Etymology
The species is named for Capt. Richard Stephen, who collected the holotype.

References

Eoophyla
Moths described in 2012